Dandelion Dead is a British TV mini-series produced by LWT for ITV that aired in two parts on 6 and 13 February 1994. It tells the true story of Herbert Rowse Armstrong, a solicitor in the provincial town of Hay-on-Wye, Wales, who was convicted and hanged in May 1922 for the murder of his wife and the attempted murder of a fellow solicitor and business rival, Oswald Martin.

The series starred Michael Kitchen as Major Armstrong, Sarah Miles as Catherine Armstrong, David Thewlis as Oswald Martin and Lesley Sharp as Constance, Martin's wife. It was directed by Mike Hodges and won a BAFTA in 1995. As well as telling the main story of Major Armstrong's crimes, the series develops the courtship of Martin and his wife and shows the effects of events on Armstrong's children.

Cast
 Michael Kitchen as Major Herbert Rowse Armstrong 
 Sarah Miles as Catherine Armstrong 
 David Thewlis as Oswald Martin 
 Lesley Sharp as Constance 'Connie' Martin, née Davies 
 Peter Vaughan as Doctor Hinks 
 Diana Quick as Marion Glassford-Gale 
 Bernard Hepton as Mr. Davies 
 Don Henderson as Chief Inspector Crutchett 
 Robert Stephens as Henry Vaughan 
 Nicholas Selby as Sir Bernard Spilsbury
 Roger Lloyd-Pack as Phillips

Reception
Ray Loynd, writing for the Los Angeles Times, called the series "full of rich atmosphere, ripe characters and black humor". He noted that "The movie’s real accomplishment is in catching the fabric of a whole town, almost in the manner of a Victorian novel."

References

External links
 

1994 British television series debuts
1994 British television series endings
1990s British drama television series
1990s British television miniseries
BAFTA winners (television series)
ITV television dramas
Television series by ITV Studios
London Weekend Television shows
English-language television shows